Peter Makuck (born October 26, 1940) is an American poet, short story writer, and critic. He is distinguished professor emeritus of English at East Carolina University, where he was also the first distinguished professor of arts and sciences; he has also served as visiting writer in residence at Brigham Young University, visiting distinguished professor at North Carolina State University, and visiting distinguished writer-in-residence at the University of North Carolina-Wilmington.  In 1993 Makuck received the Charity Randall Citation from the International Poetry Forum. Poems, stories, and reviews by Makuck have been published in many leading journals, including Poetry, The Southern Review, The Hudson Review, Ploughshares, and others, and his work has been featured on the Poetry Daily website and on Garrison Keillor's Writer's Almanac. Makuck was the founding editor of the journal Tar River Poetry.  He lives with his wife, Phyllis, on Bogue Banks, one of North Carolina's barrier islands.

Education
Makuck received his B.A. from St. Francis College (now part of the University of New England) in Maine, his M.A. from Niagara University, and his Ph.D. from Kent State University, where he wrote his dissertation on William Faulkner. As a student he witnessed the 1970 Kent State shootings; his early poem "The Commons" addresses this event.

Themes
According to Lorraine Hale Robinson, Makuck's poems "repeatedly explore the themes of epiphany and second chances; of the relations of mystery, grace, and beauty; and of the revalatory effects of jolts of violence."  He has a "compelling interest in place....[T]he landscapes of Eastern North Carolina have influenced his work," as has the desert Southwest (214-215).

Matthew Schmeer, in his review of Makuck's Off-season in the Promised Land, notes that

Acceptance is as an undercurrent in these poems: acceptance of time, of fate, of the changing seasons, of loss, of the gifts and glimpses of the natural world. It would be easy to label Makuck a naturalist after reading this collection, as fully three-fourths of the pieces are about encounters with whales, hawks, fish, weather, shifting sandbars and whatnot. But . . . Makuck does not see nature as wholly benevolent. There is always an undercurrent of danger, of quiet violence, times when a quick squall can blow in from offshore, when the beauty of the landed fish is admired for a moment before the knife is unsheathed. Hawks and hurricanes cannot be held to moral standards, and Makuck revels in revealing this seam where violence and calm collide. . . .

Works
Poetry

 Mandatory Evacuation. Rochester, NY: BOA Editions, 2016. 
 Long Lens: New & Selected Poems. Rochester, NY: BOA Editions, 2010. 
 Off-Season in the Promised Land. Rochester, NY: BOA Editions, 2005. 
 Against Distance. Rochester, NY: BOA Editions, 1997. 
 Shorelines. Maryville, MO: Green Tower P, 1995. 
 The Sunken Lightship. Rochester, NY: BOA Editions, 1990. 
 Pilgrims. Bristol, RI: Ampersand P, 1987. 
 Where We Live. Rochester, NY: BOA Editions, 1982. 
 
Short Story Collections

 Wins & Losses. Syracuse, NY: Syracuse UP, 2016. 
 Allegiance and Betrayal. Syracuse, NY: Syracuse UP, 2013. 
 Costly Habits. Columbia, MO: U of Mo P, 2002.  
 Breaking and Entering. Champaign, IL: U of Illinois P, 1981.  

Criticism

 An Open World: Essays on Leslie Norris. Co-edited with Eugene England.  Rochester, NY: Camden House, 1994.

References 

 Ettari, Gary.  "The Poet and the Sea: An Interview with Peter Makuck."  North Carolina Literary Review Number 16 (2007): 66–74.
 Robinson, Lorraine Hale.  "Peter Makuck," in "Dictionary of North Carolina Writers: Lacy to Mathabane."  North Carolina Literary Review Number 9 (2000): 214–215.
 Schmeer, Matthew.  Review of Off-season in the Promised Land. The Great American Pin-up, 24 Feb 2006.
 Peter Makuck Faculty Profile Page, East Carolina University 
 Publisher Bio Note, BOA Editions 
 Tar River Poetry Homepage

East Carolina University faculty
American male poets
Poets from North Carolina
Brigham Young University faculty
North Carolina State University faculty
Kent State University alumni
Niagara University alumni
University of New England (United States) alumni
1940 births
Living people